There have been two baronetcies created for persons named Cameron, both in the baronetage of the United Kingdom. Both titles are extinct.

Cameron baronets, of Fassiefern (1817)
The Cameron baronetcy, of Fassiefern and Callart in the County of Argyll and of Arthurstone in the County of Angus, was gazetted in 1815, but not created until 8 March 1817, for:-

Sir Ewen Cameron, 1st Baronet (1740–1828) (whose son was John Cameron of Fassiefern (1771–1815); it was in recognition of John's military service that the baronetcy was created).
Sir Duncan Cameron, 2nd Baronet (1775–1863)

Cameron baronets, of Balclutha (1893)
The Cameron baronetcy, of Balclutha in the parish of Greenock in the County of Renfrew, was created on 27 August 1893 for the Liberal Party politician Charles Cameron, a former editor of the North British Daily Mail who was at that time the member of parliament (MP) for Glasgow College. Upon the death in 1924 of Sir Charles, his son John succeeded to the baronetcy – which became extinct on his death.

Sir Charles Cameron, 1st Baronet (1841–1924), MP for Glasgow 1874–1885, for Glasgow College 1885–1895, Glasgow Bridgeton 1897–1900 and President of the Cremation Society 1904–1921
Sir John Cameron, 2nd Baronet (1903–1968), President of the Cremation Society of Great Britain 1960–1968

See also
 John Cameron of Fassiefern
 Clan Cameron

References

Extinct baronetcies in the Baronetage of the United Kingdom